Sitel Television (Macedonian: Сител Телевизија, Sitel Televizija) is the second private television channel in North Macedonia.

Programmes

Sitel Television was founded on 22 January 1993, as the second private and independent TV station in North Macedonia. The current number of employees is approximately 150 (managing and editorial board, journalists, reporters, announcers, technical staff, marketing and administration) and there are also a large number of correspondents and external cooperators. Sitel TV airs many types of genres, including information, culture, arts, documentaries, entertainment, sports and children's programs. However, the main output is "Informative programming", which includes central news bulletins aired at 19:00 and 23:00 (or 23:15), short news aired at 16:00, as well as round tables, interviews and dialogues.

Recent polls of Macedonian viewers suggest that Sitel TV is the most watched television broadcaster in North Macedonia since the previously most popular A1 channel has slipped into insolvency.

In the beginning of 2007, Sitel TV began broadcasting its program over a satellite that covers everywhere in the world. Currently, it broadcasts on Eutelsat W2 and Intelsat 901 to audiences in Europe, USA, Canada and Australia.

That was broadcaster of FIBA EuroBasket and FIBA Basketball World Cup

Series

 Ugly Betty
 Prison Break
 Heroes
 Threshold
 Twin Peaks
 Elveda Rumeli
 South Beach
 Sex, Lies and Secrets
 Jericho
 The 4400
 The West Wing
 ER
 Everybody loves Raymond
 Will and Grace
 Medium
 Las Vegas
 That '70s Show
 Absolutely Fabulous
 7th Heaven
 NCIS
 Deadwood
 JAG
 Il bello delle donne
 Melrose Place
 'Allo 'Allo!
 Cybill
 LazyTown (Мрзливиот Град)
 The Office
 Psi Factor: Chronicles of the Paranormal
 Baldini e Simoni
 Love, Inc.
 Coupling
 Out of Practice
 Courting Alex
 Jake 2.0
 BeastMaster
 Conan
 Party of Five
 Undressed
 Family Ties
 Fresh Prince of Bel-Air
 I'll Take Manhattan
 Paradise Falls
 Unsolved Mysteries
 Lois & Clark: The New Adventures of Superman
 Quantum Leap
 Borgen
 Total Drama (Вкупно Драма)
 Peppa Pig (Прасенцето Пепа)
Camp Lazlo! (Камп Ласло!)
My Little Pony: Friendship is Magic (Моето мало пони: Пријателство е магија)
Chowder (TV series) (Чаудер)

Soap operas

 Triunfo del Amor 
 El Cartel
 Sortilegio
 Más Sabe el Diablo
 El Clon
 Doña Bárbara
 Cuidado con el Angel
 Niños Ricos, Pobres Padres
 Juro Que Te Amo
 La Traición
 Sin Senos no hay Paraíso
 El Rostro de Analía
 Tormenta en el Paraiso
 Fuego en la sangre
 Zorro: La Espada y la Rosa
 As the World Turns
 La Fea Mas Bella
 Pasión
 Marina
 Destilando Amor
 Tierra de Pasiones
 La Tormenta
 Código Postal
 Heridas de Amor
 Mundo de Fieras
 Peregrina
 Mas sabe el diablo
 La esposa virgen
 La Madrastra
 Alborada
 Inocente de ti
 La Heredera
 Resistiré
 La usurpadora
 Romántica obsesión
 Franco Buenaventura: El Profe
 A Casa das Sete Mulheres
 Amor real
 Milagros
 Esperança
 Rosa diamante
 Los Rey
 Sangre de mi tierra
 La esclava blanca

References

External links

Sitel Television at LyngSat Address
Sitel Television live

Television channels in North Macedonia
Television channels and stations established in 1993